{{Infobox animanga/Print
| type            = manga
| author          = Daigo Murasaki
| illustrator     = Kiiro Akashiro
| publisher       = Kadokawa Shoten
| publisher_en    = 
| demographic     = Shōnen
| magazine        = Shōnen Ace Plus
| first           = November 5, 2021
| last            = 
| volumes         = 
| volume_list     = 
}}

 is a Japanese light novel series written by Daigo Murasaki and illustrated by Kureta. The series began publication by Fujimi Shobo under their Fujimi Fantasia Bunko imprint in January 2021. The light novel series has been licensed in English by Yen Press. A manga adaptation by Kiiro Akashiro began serialization online in Kadokawa Shoten's Shōnen Ace Plus in November 2021.

Plot
In the magical fantasy world of Alneath, the villainous Demon Lord Veltol Velvet Velsvalt was slain in battle by the hero Gram. 500 years later, his subordinate Machina Soleige uses magic to revive Veltol. During his time away however, Alneath underwent a catastrophe known as the "Fantasion" when it merged with the industrial world of Earth in the year 2023. This resulted in prejudice between various races, the collapse of national boundaries, and wars between newly established city states. After the wars, relative peace broke out, and Alneath's magic was combined with Earth's industry to create magical engineering known as "magineering". Veltol is revived in the year 2099 in the city state of Shinjuku (formerly Tokyo), and together Machina and her hacker friend Takahashi, he attempts to regain his power and once again attempt world domination.

Media
Light novels

ReceptionDemon Lord 2099'' won the 33rd Fantasia Grand Prize.

References

External links
Demon Lord 2099 at Fantasia Taisho (in Japanese).

2021 Japanese novels
Anime and manga based on light novels
Cyberpunk anime and manga
Cyberpunk novels
Fujimi Fantasia Bunko
Isekai anime and manga
Isekai novels and light novels
Japanese fantasy novels
Japanese science fiction novels
Japanese webcomics
Kadokawa Dwango franchises
Kadokawa Shoten manga
Light novels
Novels set in the 2090s
Science fantasy anime and manga
Science fantasy novels
Webcomics in print
Yen Press titles